Narberth RFC are a Welsh rugby union club based in Narberth in Pembrokeshire. They are members of the Welsh Rugby Union playing in the WRU Championship and are a feeder club for the Scarlets. The Otters have won the Pembrokeshire County Cup competition.

Notable former players
  Brian Williams

References

Rugby clubs established in 1882
Welsh rugby union teams
Sport in Pembrokeshire
RFC